The Battle of Hazalo was fought between the forces of Adal Sultanate led by Nur ibn Mujahid, and Oromo of Gada Michelle. Nur and his troops were returning from a victory at the Battle of Fatagar against the Ethiopian Imperial army, when they were ambushed sustaining heavy casualties. Adal's elite soldiers the Malassay were killed in large number effectively ending the Harari states regional superiority. Nur and a few of his troops however were able to push back the Oromo and return to Harar.

References

Adal Sultanate
History of Ethiopia